IROC XXIV was the twenty-fourth season of the International Race of Champions, which started on February 18, 2000. The series used identically prepared Pontiac Firebird Trans Am race cars, and contested races at Daytona International Speedway, Talladega Superspeedway, Michigan International Speedway, and Indianapolis Motor Speedway. Dale Earnhardt won $225,000 and his second consecutive championship, and his fourth and final overall.

The roster of drivers and final points standings were as follows:

Race results

Daytona International Speedway, Race One
 Dale Earnhardt
 Tony Stewart
 Jeff Burton
 Mark Martin
 Dale Earnhardt Jr.
 Rusty Wallace
 Bobby Labonte
 Dale Jarrett
 Greg Ray
 Jeff Gordon
 Eddie Cheever
 Mark Dismore

This would be Dale Earnhardt's 34th and final victory at Daytona, the most of any auto racing driver in the track's history.

Talladega Superspeedway, Race Two
 Bobby Labonte
 Mark Martin
 Dale Earnhardt
 Jeff Burton
 Jeff Gordon
 Tony Stewart
 Greg Ray
 Dale Jarrett
 Rusty Wallace
 Eddie Cheever
 Dale Earnhardt Jr.
 Mark Dismore

Michigan International Speedway, Race Three
 Eddie Cheever
 Tony Stewart
 Dale Earnhardt
 Mark Martin
 Dale Jarrett
 Bobby Labonte
 Jeff Gordon
 Dale Earnhardt Jr.
 Rusty Wallace
 Mark Dismore
 Greg Ray
 Jeff Burton

Indianapolis Motor Speedway, Race Four
 Mark Martin
 Dale Earnhardt
 Tony Stewart
 Jeff Gordon
 Rusty Wallace
 Bobby Labonte
 Eddie Cheever
 Dale Jarrett
 Dale Earnhardt Jr.
 Greg Ray
 Mark Dismore
 Jeff Burton

References

International Race of Champions
2000 in American motorsport